Francis Buchanan  (15 February 1762 – 15 June 1829), later known as Francis Hamilton but often referred to as Francis Buchanan-Hamilton, was a Scottish physician who made significant contributions as a geographer, zoologist, and botanist while living in India. He did not assume the name of Hamilton until three years after his retirement from India.

The standard botanical author abbreviation Buch.-Ham. is applied to plants and animals he described, though today the form "Hamilton, 1822" is more usually seen in ichthyology and is preferred by Fishbase.

Early life
Francis Buchanan was born at Bardowie, Callander, Perthshire where Elizabeth, his mother, lived on the estate of Branziet; his father Thomas, a physician, came in Spittal and claimed the chiefdom of the name of Buchanan and owned the Leny estate. Francis Buchanan matriculated in 1774 and received an MA in 1779. As he had three older brothers, he had to earn a living from a profession, so Buchanan studied medicine at the University of Edinburgh, graduating MD in 1783. His thesis was on febris intermittens (malaria). He then served on Merchant Navy ships to Asia, and served in the Bengal Medical Service from 1794 to 1815. He also studied botany under John Hope in Edinburgh. Hope was among the first in Britain to teach the Linnean system of botanical nomenclature, although he knew of several others having been trained under Antoine Laurent de Jussieu.

Career in India
Buchanan's early career was on board ships plying between England and Asia. The first few years were spent as surgeon aboard the Duke of Montrose sailing between Bombay and China under Captain Alexander Gray and later Captain Joseph Dorin. He then served on the Phoenix along the Coromandel Coast again under Captain Gray. In 1794, he served on the Rose, sailing from Portsmouth to Calcutta, and reaching Calcutta in September, he joined the Medical Service of the Bengal Presidency. Buchanan's training was ideal as a surgeon naturalist for a political mission to the Kingdom of Ava in Burma under Captain Symes (as replacement for the previously appointed surgeon Peter Cochrane). The Ava mission set sail on the Sea Horse and passed the Andaman Islands, Pegu, and Ava before returning to Calcutta.

In 1799, after the defeat of Tipu Sultan and the fall of Mysore, he was asked to survey South India, resulting in A Journey from Madras through the Countries of Mysore, Canara and Malabar (1807). He also wrote An Account of the Kingdom of Nepal (1819).

He conducted two surveys, the first of Mysore in 1800 and the second of Bengal in 1807–14. From 1803 to 1804, he was surgeon to the governor general of India Lord Wellesley in Calcutta, where he also organized a zoo that was to become the Calcutta Alipore Zoo. In 1804, he was in charge of the Institution for Promoting the Natural History of India founded by Wellesley at Barrackpore.

From 1807 to 1814, under the instructions of the government of Bengal, he made a comprehensive survey of the areas within the jurisdiction of the British East India Company.  He was asked to report on topography, history, antiquities, the condition of the inhabitants, religion, natural productions (particularly fisheries, forests, mines, and quarries), agriculture (covering vegetables, implements, manure, floods, domestic animals, fences, farms, and landed property, fine and common arts, and commerce (exports and imports, weights and measures, and conveyance of goods).  His conclusions are reported in a series of treatises that are retained in major United Kingdom libraries; many have been reissued in modern editions.  They include an important work on Indian fish species, entitled An account of the fishes found in the river Ganges and its branches (1822), which describes over 100 species not formerly recognised scientifically.

He also collected and described many new plants in the region, and collected a series of watercolours of Indian and Nepalese plants and animals, probably painted by Indian artists, which are now in the library of the Linnean Society of London  

He was elected a Fellow of the Royal Society in May, 1806, and a Fellow of the Royal Society of Edinburgh in January 1817.

Later life
He succeeded William Roxburgh to become the superintendent of the Calcutta botanical garden in 1814, but had to return to Britain in 1815 due to his ill health. In an interesting incident, the notes that he took of Hope's botany lectures in 1780 were lent to his shipmate Alexander Boswell during a voyage in 1785. Boswell lost the notes in Satyamangalam in Mysore and the notes went into the hands of Tipu Sultan, who had them rebound. In 1800, they were found in Tippu's library by a major who returned them to Buchanan.

Buchanan left India in 1815, and in the same year inherited his mother's estate and in consequence took her surname of Hamilton, referring to himself as "Francis Hamilton, formerly Buchanan" or simply "Francis Hamilton".  However, he is variously referred to by others as "Buchanan-Hamilton", "Francis Hamilton Buchanan", or "Francis Buchanan Hamilton".

From 1814 until 1829 he was the official Keeper of the Royal Botanic Garden, Edinburgh succeeding William Roxburgh.

Taxon named in his honor

Reptiles

Francis Buchanan-Hamilton is commemorated in the scientific name of a species of South Asian turtle, Geoclemys hamiltoni.

Fish
The fish Thryssa hamiltonii is one of the many fish named after Hamilton.
The Burmese gobyeel Taenioides buchanani (Day, 1873) is named after him.
Notropis buchanani Meek 1896
Psilorhynchus hamiltoni Conway, Dittmer, Jezisek & H. H. Ng, 2013
The mullet Crenimugil buchanani (Bleeker 1853)
The mullet Sicamugil hamiltonii (Day 1870)

Abbreviation

Taxon described by him
See :Category:Taxa named by Francis Buchanan-Hamilton

See also
Claudius Buchanan Rev. Claudius Buchanan was also frequently referred as Dr. Buchanan in missionary journals.

References

Further reading

 – in three volumes, publishers noted as booksellers to the Asiatic Society and the East India Company, respectively.
 Volume 1 Volume 2 Volume 3
 Noltie, H.J. (1999) Indian botanical drawings 1793–1868.

External links
 
 

1762 births
1829 deaths
People from Stirling (council area)
Botanists with author abbreviations
Scottish botanists
Botanists active in India
British pteridologists
Scottish zoologists
Scottish sailors
Scottish ichthyologists
Fellows of the Royal Society
Newar studies scholars
Alumni of the University of Edinburgh
Fellows of the Royal Society of Edinburgh
Fellows of the Linnean Society of London
Scottish people of the British Empire
Scottish geographers
18th-century Scottish medical doctors
19th-century Scottish medical doctors
People educated at the High School of Glasgow
Scottish travel writers
British people in colonial India